Ilex subtriflora is a species of plant in the family Aquifoliaceae. It is endemic to Jamaica.

References

subtriflora
Endemic flora of Jamaica
Critically endangered flora of North America
Taxonomy articles created by Polbot